1-Aminopentane is an organic compound with the formula CH3(CH2)4NH2. It is used as a solvent, as a raw material in the manufacture of a variety of other compounds, including dyes, emulsifiers, and pharmaceutical products, and as a flavoring agent.

Pentylamine exhibits reactions typical of other simple alkyl amines, i.e. protonation, alkylation, acylation, condensation with carbonyls. Like other simple aliphatic amines, pentylamine is a weak base: the pKa of [CH3(CH2)4NH3]+ is 10.21.

See also
 3-Aminopentane

References

Alkylamines